Thomas Nelson House may refer to:

Thomas Nelson House (Boonville, Missouri), listed on the NRHP in Missouri
Thomas Nelson House (Peekskill, New York), listed on the NRHP in New York
Thomas Nelson House (Yorktown, Virginia), contributing property to Colonial National Historical Park

See also
Nelson House (disambiguation)